"Lux Æterna" is a song by American heavy metal band Metallica, released on November 28, 2022 as the lead single from their upcoming eleventh studio album, 72 Seasons (2023). The song was first played live on December 16, 2022, at the Microsoft Theater in Los Angeles. James Hetfield has described the song as "an upbeat, kind of fast and joyous song" furthermore, describing it as a NWOBHM song. The song reached number 1 on the Billboard Hot Mainstream Rock Tracks chart for 11 consecutive weeks, tied with their cover of Bob Seger's "Turn the Page".

Music video 
The music video, directed by Tim Saccenti was first filmed on November 3rd, 2022 and features the band playing live on a stage. Throughout the entire video, lasers flash on screen in sync with the band playing. Kirk Hammett described the music video as if the band was playing inside a Volcano, as well as pointing out that James Hetfield got too close to the lasers and that he has had LASIK surgery and should "steer clear".

Reception 
Writing for Musictalkers, Nicholas Gaudet described the vocals during the chorus as "astonishing" as well as praising the outro and guitar solo. Gaudet also interpreted the song as a retrospective look back on their career, calling it the best thing they have done in two decades. Jon Hadusek of Consequence, also praised the song, also stating that the song picks up where "Hardwired... to Self-Destruct" left off. He states that the song takes influence from pop-punk as well as the typical thrash metal.

Personnel 

 James Hetfield – vocals, rhythm guitar
 Lars Ulrich – drums
 Kirk Hammett – lead guitar
 Robert Trujillo – bass, backing vocals

Charts

References 

2022 songs
2022 singles
Metallica songs
Songs written by James Hetfield
Songs written by Lars Ulrich